Peterson's, founded in 1966, is an American company that has a wide range of print and digital products and services, including test preparation, career exploration tools, memory retention techniques, and school, financial aid, and scholarship searches. Peterson's is currently headquartered in Denver, Colorado. It was formerly headquartered for many years in Lawrence Township, New Jersey.

Peterson's was privately held until its 1995 purchase by The Thomson Corporation. It became part of Thomson Learning (spun off in 2007 as Cengage Learning).
On July 27, 2006, Peterson's was acquired by the Nelnet family of companies. On December 31, 2017 Peterson's was acquired by Triangle Digital Ventures. In 2019, Peterson's acquired B.E.S. Publishing.

Acquired and child companies

Peterson's has acquired several companies in the educational space, including Peterson's Velocity (formerly Mind Streams) in 2016, and the Dean Vaughn Total Retention System in 2015.

Test prep offerings

Peterson's test preparation products include online courses and practice tests, as well as printed study guides. They cover a wide range of topics including SAT, ACT, PSAT, AP Exams, College Level Examination Program (CLEP), Test of English as a Foreign Language (TOEFL), Armed Services Vocational Aptitude Battery (ASVAB), civil service, nursing, EMT, postal service, caseworker, law enforcement, and more. They also offer several free and paid practice tests on their website.

Peterson's online courses for the SAT, ACT, ASVAB and Accuplacer and feature a pre-test that determines each user's strengths and weaknesses. Based on diagnostic results, the lessons in the course are personalized to focus on the material that requires the most improvement.

Civil service and military

Civil Service test prep study books include, publications for Case Worker Exam, Civil Service Exams, Firefighter Exam, Emergency Dispatcher/911 Operator Exam, EMT Basic Certification, Law Enforcement Exams, and the U S. Postal Service Test 470. These Peterson's book publications contain several practice tests and course outlines.

Peterson's has negotiated contracts with the U.S. Military to offer individualized portals for enlisted Army, Navy, Marine Corps, Coast Guard, and Air Force personnel. Online test prep is available for the ASVAB, as well as various college readiness exams.

References

External links
Peterson's Consumer Website

Companies based in Colorado
Education companies established in 1966
Lawrence Township, Mercer County, New Jersey
Test preparation companies
1966 establishments in New Jersey